Pokhariya  is a municipality in Parsa District in the Narayani Zone of southern Nepal. At the time of the 2011 Nepal census it had a population of 6,995 people living in 1,015 individual households.

The normal temperature is 29 to 35 degree Celsius in summer where as in winter it falls down 14 to 25 degree Celsius which indicates that the climatic condition of summer is extremely hot where as in winter its extremely cold. The month of June is considered as the days having hottest climatic condition where as January has coldest climatic condition.

References

Populated places in Parsa District
Nepal municipalities established in 2014
Municipalities in Madhesh Province